Christine Jensen may refer to:

 Christine Bøe Jensen (born 1975), Norwegian footballer
 Christine Jensen Burke (born 1968), New Zealand mountain climber
 Christine Jensen (campaigner) (1939-2001), British fishing industry safety campaigner
 Christine Jensen (musician) (born 1970), Canadian musician